Grabno may refer to the following places:

In Poland:
Grabno, Lesser Poland Voivodeship (south Poland)
Grabno, Łódź Voivodeship (central Poland)
Grabno, Lubusz Voivodeship (west Poland)
Grabno, Pomeranian Voivodeship (north Poland)
Grabno, Warmian-Masurian Voivodeship (north Poland)
Grabno, Szczecinek County in West Pomeranian Voivodeship (north-west Poland)
Grabno, Świdwin County in West Pomeranian Voivodeship (north-west Poland)

In Slovenia:
Gradno, a settlement in the Municipality of Brda (known as Grabno until 1952)